Robert Alexander Lindsay (18 April 1890 – 21 October 1958) was a British sprinter who competed at the 1920 Summer Olympics. He reached the quarterfinals of 400 m and ran the second leg in the British 4 × 400 m relay team, which won the gold medal. Next year he won the British AAA  title, beating the Olympic champion Bevil Rudd.

References

1890 births
1958 deaths
People from the London Borough of Wandsworth
Athletes from London
English male sprinters
British male sprinters
Olympic male sprinters
Olympic athletes of Great Britain
Olympic gold medallists for Great Britain
Athletes (track and field) at the 1920 Summer Olympics
English Olympic medallists
Medalists at the 1920 Summer Olympics
Olympic gold medalists in athletics (track and field)